Slow Drag may refer to:

Slow drag (dance), a popular American dance
Slow Drag (album), Donald Byrd album